Kole Manev (Macedonian: Коле Манев) (1941-) Born in Bapčor, Kastoria. Macedonian painter and film director.

Education and career
Kole Manev is one of a group of Macedonian painters, expelled from their homes in Aegean Macedonia during the Greek Civil War 1948. He was educated in Skopje and Belgrade. He also studied in Paris and attended lectures in Prague for an animated film. He had several solo and group exhibitions in Macedonia, France and the countries of the region. In 2012, Manevv exhibited 29 paintings in the new multimedia center "House Exclusive".

Awards and accomplishments
In 2006, Manev received the French Embassy decoration "Honorary Knight of Art" which is given to merited artists for engagement in the field of culture. 
One of his painting hangs in the Republic of Macedonia Lobby of the Cabinet of the President of Assembly. In 2001 during the annual celebration, the Day of the Macedonian Revolutionary Struggle on 23 October, Parliament presented Manev, along with writer Paskal Gilevski and university professor Tome Nenovski, the 23 October National Award.

References

External links
 Kole Manev Website

1941 births
Clergy from Skopje
Living people
Macedonian contemporary artists
Film people from Skopje